This glossary provides definitions and context for terminology related to, and jargon specific to, the sport of pickleball. Words or phrases in italics can be found on the list in their respective alphabetic sections.

0–9 
0–0See Zero–Zero
0–0–2 or 0–0–start See Zero–Zero–Two.

A
AceAny serve that is not returned by the receiver, or, more specifically, a serve that the receiver's paddle never touches. The term, originally used in Tennis, has been attributed to American sportswriter Allison Danzig.
Andiamo!Meaning "Let's go!" in Italian, it can be heard after a player wins a particularly critical point. The term was popularized in pickleball by professional player Julian Arnold.
APPSee Association of Pickleball Professionals
Approach shotA shot executed while moving from the backcourt towards the non-volley line.
Around-the-post (ATP)A legal shot that travels outside the net posts, allowing its trajectory to stay below the height of the net.
Association of Pickleball ProfessionalsA pro pickleball tour sanctioned by USA Pickleball.
At the netA player positioned at the non-volley line; considered a strategically dominant position.
Attackable ball or Attackable shotA ball returned over the net in a way that allows the receiving side to make a strategic offensive shot. This can mean the ball was hit high and deep enough to allow their opponent to return a targeted aggressive volley from outside the non-volley zone, or the ball has enough height after the bounce to permit a targeted aggressive groundstroke.

B
BackcourtThe area of the court located near the baseline.
BackhandStriking the ball with the reverse side of the paddle while the back of the player’s hand is facing the net. 
BackspinSee Spin.
BackswingThe backward movement of the paddle in advance of striking the ball.
BagelA shutout game ending when one team earned no points. In a standard pickleball game, an 11-0 ending score.
BakerSee Shake & bake.
Bainbridge CupAn international pickleball competition organized by the International Federation of Pickleball, or the trophy awarded at the competition.
Bainbridge IslandAn island in the state of Washington, USA, where the sport of pickleball was invented at the home of Joel Pritchard.
Ball! or Ball on!A call made to alert all players when an errant ball is on the court, usually a ball from another court. For safety, all play should immediately stop and the serve started over once the court is clear.
Ball typePickleballs come in two basic types, "indoor" or "outdoor", but some may be labeled "hybrid" with features that fall between the two. Rules permit any USAP approved ball to be used in indoor or outdoor matches.
Hybrid ball: A pickleball with features somewhere between an indoor ball and an outdoor ball.
Indoor ball: A pickleball designed primarily for indoor play. Characteristics of an indoor ball include fewer holes, each with a larger diameter, less weight, and softer less durable plastic. The design provides better performance where wind is not a factor, and the court is smooth, such as a wood floor.
Outdoor ball: A pickleball designed primarily for outdoor play. Characteristics of an outdoor ball include more holes, each with a smaller diameter, more weight, and harder more durable plastic. The design provides better performance in wind and more durability for rough outdoor courts.
BangerA player that hits mostly powerful drive shots.
BaselinesThe lines parallel to the net at the back of the pickleball court  from the net.  
BashA hard shot that hits the top of the net (i.e. the tape) and then lands in play on the opponent's side of the court. A bash is typically unintentional and very difficult to return as the ball changes speed and/or direction due to contact with the net.
BertIn doubles, a poach shot where a player crosses in front of their partner to execute an erne on their partner's side of the court.
Block shot or BlockingA backhanded defensive shot with little or no backswing intended to slow the ball and drop it in the opponent’s non-volley zone; used in response to a body shot.
Body shotA shot that hits the body of the opposing player, thereby winning the point. Care should be taken to avoid the head, neck or face.
Bounce it!In doubles, a call made by one partner to the other instructing them to allow the ball to bounce before striking the ball. Called when a player thinks the ball may land out of bounds.

C
CarryHitting the ball in such a way that it does not bounce away from the paddle but tends to be carried along on the face of the paddle. This is a fault.
CenterlineThe line bisecting the service courts that extends from the non-volley line to the baseline.
Chainsaw serveA serve that starts by swiping, brushing or rolling the ball against the paddle before tossing the ball in preparation for striking the ball, thereby imparting spin on the ball, then striking the ball with a topspin stroke imparting even more spin. The serve was popularized by Zane Navratil and is sometimes referred to as the Zane Navratil serve. As of 2021 the serve is no longer allowed per USAP rules, but still permitted in unsanctioned PPA pro games.
Chicken wingAn awkward defensive shot made with the paddle arm bent and the elbow extended up and away from the body. It also can refer to the shoulder and armpit area, on the paddle side of a player's body, that when targeted can force the player to make a chicken wing defensive shot.
Chip shotSee Chop.
Chop, Chip, Cut, or Slice shotStriking the ball using a slightly open faced paddle while moving the paddle in a downward undercutting motion to impart backspin on the ball.
Closed faceTilting the paddle face down when striking the ball with the upper edge of the racket angled forward. (See also Flat face and Open face)
Continental gripHolding the paddle handle so that the index finger and thumb form a "V" in line with the edge of the paddle. (See also Grip (tennis))
CorkspinSee Spin.
CrosscourtThe opponent's half of the court that is diagonally opposite the player striking the ball.
Crush & rushSee Shake & bake.
Cut shotSee Chop.

D
Dead ballA ball that is no longer in play, or any action that stops play. A dead ball occurs whenever one of the following occur; a fault is committed, the ball strikes a permanent object, or a hindrance is called.
Dink or Dink shotA soft return shot made at, in, or near the non-volley zone, after the ball has bounced, that just clears the net and drops into the opponent's non-volley zone.
Dink volleyA soft return shot made at or near the non-volley line, prior to the ball bouncing, that just clears the net and drops into the opponent's non-volley zone.
DinkerA pickleball player that is exceptionally good at dinking.
Double-bounce ruleSee Two-bounce rule.
Double hitHitting the ball twice with the paddle before the ball is returned. A valid play as long as the hits are both performed as part of one continuous stroke. Double hit might also refer to hitting the ball twice, involving one player or both players on a team, but using two separate strokes. This is a fault.
Doubles Pickleball matches having two players per side. (See also Singles)
Mixed doubles: Both sides have one male player and one female player.
Men's doubles: Both sides have two male players.
Women's doubles: Both sides have two female players.
Drive shotA powerful groundstroke or volley hit fast and low over the net to the opponent's backcourt.
Drop serve See Serve.
Drop or Drop shotA soft return shot made from the back court or mid court, after the ball has bounced, that lands in or near the opponent's non-volley zone.
Drop volleyA soft return shot made from the back court or mid court, prior to the ball bouncing, that lands in or near the opponent's non-volley zone.

E
ErneA volley hit near the net by a player positioned outside the court or in the process of leaping outside the court. A legally executed erne shot allows a player to hit the ball closer to the net without stepping in the non-volley zone. Named for Erne Perry, the first person credited with using the shot in mainstream competitive play.
Even service courtSee Service court.

F
FaultAn infringement of the rules that ends a rally and results in a dead ball.
First server, First serveIn doubles; the first team member to serve the ball after a side–out. If a side-out occurs when the team's score is even, the team's starting server will be the first server, otherwise the non-starting server will be the first server. (See also Starting server)
Flat faceKeeping the paddle face parallel with the plane of the net when striking the ball without angling the racket up or down. (See also Closed face and Open face)
Foot faultA foot fault can occur when serving or when volleying.
When serving; failure to keep both feet behind the baseline, with at least one foot in contact with the ground or floor, when the paddle contacts the ball.
When vollying; stepping on or into the non-volley zone, including any line around the non-volley zone, while volleying a ball, or when carried into the NVZ by momentum after volleying the ball.
Full stackSee Stacking

G
GripMay refer to;
The manner a player holds the paddle: The most common grip style is the Continental grip. (See also Grip (tennis))
The material covering the handle of the paddle. Some factors considered when choosing a grip material include; cushioning, breathability, tackiness, thickness and durability.
Groundstroke or Ground strokeA ball that is struck after it bounces.

H
Half stackSee Stacking
Half VolleyA ground stroke that is struck low to the ground immediately after the ball bounces.
Hand signal(s)A non-verbal cue used to communicate during the game. Hand signals might be used by line judges or players. Common hand signals include:
Hand covering eyes: A line judge's signal that they are unable to make a call because their view of the ball was obscured.
Pointing the index finger: A call that the ball was out. The finger might be pointing up or in the direction the ball was out.
Palm facing down: A call that the ball was in.
Open palm behind the back: A signal to the receiver, from the receiver's partner, to switch sides after the return.
Closed fist behind the back: A signal to the receiver, from the receiver's partner, to not switch sides after the return.
Hinder or HindranceAn interference of play by something outside of the game, such as an errant ball or a person crossing the court. Hinders result in a dead ball, and the point is replayed. A dead ball occurs as soon as a hinder is called by either side. If it is subsequently determined that the hinder call was invalid, then the point is not replayed, and the side calling the hinder loses the point.

I
I-formationIn doubles; a player positioning strategy used by the serving team, where the non-serving player starts at the non-volley line. The intent is to confuse the receiving team while allowing the serving side to preposition one player at the net, putting pressure on the receiving side to make a quality fourth shot. The strategy can be risky and requires the non-serving player to stay low and out of the ball's flight pattern. The serving team must wait for the return ball to bounce, which means the server must cover the entire width of the court on the third shot, if their partner is already up at the non-volley line. The non-serving partner can be intentionally targeted by the receiving side forcing a fault for the serving side.
IFPSee International Federation of Pickleball.
InA line call made when a ball lands within the court lines, or in the case of a serve, within the service court. Sometimes indicated using a pointed index finger hand signal.
Incorrect positionWhen the ball is served from the wrong serving area.
Incorrect receiverIn doubles; when the wrong receiving team member returns the serve.
Incorrect serverIn doubles; when the wrong serving team member serves the ball.
Indoor ballSee Ball type.
InterferenceSee Hinder.
International Federation of Pickleball (IFP)A federation of national pickleball organizations. Established in 2010 to serve as the world governing body for the sport of pickleball.

J
JoeyHitting an ATP shot directly back at the opponent that made the ATP shot. Named for Joe Valenti.

K
KitchenSee Non-volley zone.

L
Left service court See Service court.
Let serveWhen a served ball hits the net, but still lands in the correct service court. A valid serve in USAP rules.
Line callThe determination whether a ball has landed inside or outside the court lines, or in the case of the serve, inside or outside the service court. In non-refereed matches, players are responsible for making good-faith line calls on their side of the net. When there is any uncertainty the call should be made in favor of their opponent. The point where the ball contacts the ground determines whether a ball is in or out. Although the sphere of the ball might overlap the line when viewed from above, due to the rigidity of the ball the contact point might remain outside the lines, however, an out call should not be made unless space can be clearly seen between the line and the contact point.
Lob shotHitting the ball in a high arc over the opponent's head with the objective of landing the ball in the opponent's backcourt. (See also Lob (tennis))

M
Men's doubles See Doubles.
Men's singles See Singles.
MidcourtThe area of the court between the non-volley zone and backcourt including the transition zone.
MisdirectionA strategy where a player intentionally deceives their opponent by preparing to hit the ball in a certain direction, or with a certain pace, but at the last second hitting the ball in an unexpected direction or with an unexpected pace.
Mixed doubles See Doubles.
MomentumIn physics, momentum is the tendency of a body in motion to continue its motion and direction. If a player's momentum causes that player to step in or touch the non-volley zone, after volleying the ball, that player incurs a fault. All actions that took place after the offending player volleyed the ball are void, regardless of whether the other side continued to play the point, and regardless of how many time the ball passed over the net after the offending player first volleyed the ball. Momentum may also refer to the tendency to expect a side that has won multiple consecutive points, to continue winning additional points.

N
Nasty NelsonA serve that intentionally hits the non-receiving opposing player closest to the net, rewarding the point to the server. Named for Timothy Nelson.
Navratil serveSee Chainsaw serve.
No man's landThe part of the court approximately midway between the baseline and the non-volley line. Considered a strategically vulnerable location for a player to be standing.  
The non-volley line, and the sidlenes on either side of the NVZ, are part of the non-volley zone.
Non-volley zone, NVZ or KitchenA  by  area adjacent to the net within which one may not volley the ball. The non-volley zone includes all lines around it. Also called the "kitchen". A player may step or stand within the non-volley zone at any time, but must reestablish both feet outside the non-volley zone prior to volleying the ball. If a player's momentum causes the player to touch any part of the non-volley zone after volleying the ball, it results in a dead ball and that player incurs a fault, regardless of whether the other team continued to play or not.
NVZSee Non-volley zone.

O
Odd service courtSee Service court.
Open faceTilting the paddle face up when striking the ball with the lower edge of the racket angled forward. (See also Closed face and Flat face)
OutA line call made when a ball lands outside the court lines, or in the case of a serve, outside the service court. Sometimes indicated using a palm facing down hand signal.
Out!A call made by a player which may be interpreted in one of two ways:
If "out!" is called after the ball has contacted the ground, it is considered a line call and results in a dead ball. If it is subsequently determined that the ball was not actually "out", it is a fault for the team making the call.
If "out!" is called before the ball has contacted the ground, it is considered player communication; one partner warning the other not to hit the ball. Such communication is allowed and has no bearing on the outcome of the rally, regardless of whether or not the ball lands inside or outside the applicable lines. Only a call made after the ball contacts the ground is relevant.
Outdoor ballSee Ball type.
Overhead smash See Smash.
OverspinSee Spin.

P
PaceThe speed and power imparted on the ball after it is struck by the paddle. Pace can be used strategically to control the tempo or rhythm of the game and to put the opponent on the defensive. The ability to alter pace can leave the opponent uncertain what to expect on each shot.
PantryUnofficially, the area outside the court on either side of the kitchen (Non-Volley-Zone). When a player jumps over the kitchen to execute an Erne shot, the player lands in the pantry.
Permanent objectAny object near or above the court such as the ceiling, fencing, net posts, spectators, or officials. If a ball hits a permanent object, but the ball did not yet bounce on the opposing side's court, the last player striking the ball incurs a fault. If the ball hits a permanent object after bouncing on the opposing side's court, the opposing side incurs a fault.
Pickle boatIn the sport of rowing, or crew, a pickle boat is a team of rowers made up of leftover rowers that were not selected to compete as principal rowers. Joel Pritchard's wife stated that she named the sport of pickleball after the pickle boat, because the sport was created from leftover pieces of equipment from other sports. (See Etymology of pickleball)
PickleballThe word pickleball may refer to the sport of pickleball, or to the ball used in the sport. Archaic spellings of the word include "pickle ball" and "pickle-ball".
PickledTo lose a game without scoring a single point, usually losing 11 to 0. 
PicklerA pickleball player, particularly someone obsessed with the game.
PicklesThe name of a dog owned by Joel and Joan Pritchard that is often said to be the name origin for the sport of pickleball. Joan Pritchard said the dog came along after the sport was already named, and it was the dog that was named for the sport. (See Etymology of pickleball)
PoachIn doubles; When a player crosses over to their partner's side of the court to take a shot that would normally be their partner's responsibility. Poaching can be a successful strategy to catch the opponent off guard or when there is an opportunity for a put-away shot, but can create team disharmony, if frequently performed unsuccessfully or done for the sole purpose of dominating play.
PointA point may refer to a period of the game that begins with a serve and ends with a dead ball, also known as a rally, or the score of one earned by the side that does not incur the fault. Because official pickleball rules specify side-out scoring, a point (period) only results in a point (score) when the non-serving side faults, but see Scoring for possible exceptions.

PickleBall Points Pickleball is played to 11 points, and you must win by 2 points. Player Position: The player on the right service court will always serve first for a team. 

Pop-upA ball that is hit high enough that it is easily attackable. Usually this is unintentional.
PPASee Professional Pickleball AssociationPro pickleball tourOne of two professional pickleball tours; one operated by the Association of Pickleball Professionals, the other by the Professional Pickleball Association.
Professional Pickleball AssociationA pro pickleball tour NOT sanctioned by USA Pickleball, and that may allow variations from the USA Pickleball official rules.
PukaballAn alternate name for the sport of “pickleball” used chiefly in Hawaii.
Put-awayA shot that your opponent cannot react fast enough to successfully counter.

Q
Quinned To lose multiple pickleball games without scoring a point, usually losing 11 to 0, at the same event or outing.

R
RallyContinuous play that starts with a serve and ends with a fault.
Rally scoringSee Scoring.
Ready positionThe stance a player should take in advance of their opponent hitting the ball. The best ready position may change depending on where a player is on the court, but generally means a player is; facing the ball, with both feet planted a little more than shoulder width apart, putting their weight on the balls of their feet, and holding the paddle out front about chest height.
ReceiverThe player returning the serve that is diagonally opposite the server. The receiver may be the correct or incorrect receiver.
Right service court See Service court.

S
ScoreThe current status of the game that is announced prior to each serve. In singles the score is announced as the serving side's total points followed by the receiving side's total points. In doubles the score is announced as the serving side's total points, followed by the receiving side's total points, followed by the serving side's server number.
ScoringMay refer to the point earned when a team wins a rally, or the type of scoring used during a match. Two types of scoring are commonly used, side-out scoring and rally scoring, but the official pickleball rules specify side-out scoring.
Rally Scoring: A method of play where either side can be awarded a point at the end of a rally, the point going to the side that did not commit the fault.
Side-out Scoring: A method of play where only the serving side can be awarded a point at the end of a rally, and only when the non-serving side commits a fault.
ScorpionAn overhead shot taken by a player while in a squatted position. An offensive shot often used in lieu of what might otherwise be a defensive backhand shot.
Second server, Second serveIn doubles; the person the serve passes to, and the call announced by an official, when the serving team commits their first fault after a side–out.
Serve, serviceThe initial strike of the ball to start a rally. Two types of underhand serves are permitted in pickleball.
Drop serve: A serve where the ball is dropped to the ground and allowed to bounce one or more times before striking it with the paddle.
Volley serve: A serve where the ball is struck without allowing the ball to first hit the ground.
Server numberIn doubles; either “1” or “2”, designating whether the server is the team's first or second server. It is the third number announced when the score is called.
Service court or Service area The area of the court that a valid serve must land in; bounded by the non-volley line, centerline, sideline, and baseline. All lines are considered in, except the non-volley line. A serve landing on the non-volley line is a fault.
 Left or odd service court: The service court to the left of the centerline, when facing the net. Also called the "odd service court", since a side's score will be odd whenever that side's starting server is serving from the left side of the court.
 Right or even service court: The service court to the right of the centerline, when facing the net. Also called the "even service court", since a side's score will be even whenever that side's starting server is serving from the right side of the court.
Service lineSee Baseline.
Service returnThe first ball returned over the net after a serve.
Serving areaThe area behind the baseline, and between the imaginary extended sidelines, that a valid serve can be served from.
Shake & bake or Crush & rushIn doubles; A strategy used by the serving team on the third shot. Instead of performing a third shot drop, one player (the shaker) drives the ball low and hard over the net while the other player (the baker) rushes to the net near the centerline. The intent is to pressure the opponent into making a week volley or pop up shot that the "baker" can put-away.
ShakerSee Shake & bake.
Side-outWhen the serve moves to the opponent's side of the net.
Side-out scoringSee Scoring.
SidelinesThe lines perpendicular to the net on each side of the court, denoting in- and out-of-bounds.
SidespinSee Spin.
Singles Pickleball matches having one player per side. (See also Doubles)
Men's singles: Both sides have one male player.
Women's singles: Both sides have one female player.
SliceSee Chop.
Smash or Overhead smashA powerful shot that is made while the ball is above the player's head. It permits the player to drive the ball in a sharp downward direction making it difficult to return. The shot is often used in response to a Lob shot. (See Smash (tennis))
Spin

Any rotation imparted on a ball by the strike of the paddle. Spin is commonly described as topspin, backspin, sidespin or corkspin, depending on the axis of rotation. Topspin and backspin have the same axis of rotation, but spin in opposite directions. Spin imparted on a ball is almost always a combination of more than one type of spin and would rarely exactly align with the three axes represented in diagram S. (For the science behind the effects of spin see Magnus effect.)
Backspin or Underspin: The reverse rotation of the ball in relation to the ball’s trajectory, where the axis of rotation runs parallel to the ground and parallel to the plane of the net. Backspin is imparted by brushing the back of the ball from high to low. It provides lift as the ball travels through the air and results in a lower and shorter bounce once the ball strikes the ground or tends to make the ball angle down after hitting the opponent's paddle.
Topspin or Overspin: The forward rotation of a ball in relation to the ball’s trajectory where the axis of rotation runs parallel to the ground and parallel to the plane of the net. Topspin is imparted by brushing the back of the ball from low to high. It creates a downward force as the ball travels through the air, causing the ball to dive or drop, and resulting in a higher and longer bounce once the ball strikes the ground or tends to make the ball pop up after hitting the opponent's paddle.
Sidespin: The rotation of the ball where the axis of rotation is perpendicular to the ground and parallel to the plane of the net. Sidespin is imparted by brushing the back of the ball from left to right, or right to left. It causes the ball to curve while traveling through the air and to bounce right or left after hitting the ground or opponent's paddle. In cue sports, sidespin is often referred to as english.
Corkspin or rifling: The rotation of the ball where the axis of rotation is parallel to the ground and perpendicular to the plane of the net. Corkspin is imparted by brushing up or down on either side of the ball. It has minimal effect on the ball while traveling through the air but can cause the ball to severely dart left or right after hitting the ground, but minimal effect when struck by the opponent's paddle.
StackingIn doubles; when teammates line up, or "stack", on the same side of the center line during a serve, or service return, positioning themselves to move to their preferred court positions. Preferred positions may be determined by each players skills, abilities, speed, or whether each player is right or left handed. For the purpose of serving and receiving, teammates must alternate between the right and left sides of their court each time they earn a point. Other than when acting as the server or receiver, teammates may position themselves anywhere on the court that provides them with the best advantage. Stacking permits a doubles team to quickly move into the positions they deem most advantageous. Stacking adds complexity that can result in confusion regarding which player is the correct server or receiver. The wrong server or receiver results in a fault. (See also Switching)
Half stack: when a team stacks only prior to serving
Three-quarters stack: when a team stacks prior to serving, and only half the time prior to receiving; when that team's quickest player is the receiver
Full stack: when a team stacks both prior to serving and prior to receiving
Starting serverIn doubles; the first server in a game on each side. When the starting server is serving from the right side of the court the serving side's score will be zero or an even number. When the starting server is serving from the left side of the court the serving side's score will be an odd number. The opposite is true of the non-starting server.
Swipe serveSee Chainsaw serve.
SwitchIn doubles, a call made by one partner to the other to switch sides (see switching). The call might be communicated verbally, or with a hand signal.
SwitchingIn doubles; a strategy used to position each partner in a more advantageous position. The two partners will each switch to the opposite side of the court from where they started. This may occur in mid-play when a player moves to take a ball on their partner's side of the court, and the partner then moves to the other side of the court to cover. It might also occur after a service return. The receiving team's player that is near the non-volley line may use a hand signal behind their back to indicate whether or not the two players should switch sides after the return. (See also Hand signal and Stacking)

T
Third shotThe third shot of the game that comes after the first time the receiving team returns the ball to the serving team.
Third shot dropA strategy used by the serving team to place the ball just over the net in their opponent's non-volley zone thereby making it difficult for their opponent to attack the ball, and giving the serving team time to move up to the non-volley line.
TopspinSee Spin.
Three-quarters stackSee StackingTweenerWhen a player returns a shot by hitting the ball between their own legs. This may occur when chasing down a lobbed ball that the player cannot get in front of, with the player's back to the net, or when a player is facing the net and the ball passes between their legs, and their only option is to reach around and return the ball back between their legs and over the net. (See also Tweener (tennis))
Two-bounce rule or Double-bounce RuleThe requirement that the receiving team and the serving team must each allow the ball to bounce once on their side at the beginning of every rally before attempting to volley the ball.

U
Under-spinSee Spin.
Underhand serveA serve that strikes the ball while the player's hand and paddle are moving forward with an upward arc. Official pickleball rules do not use the term "underhand serve", but the rules do state that a volley serve must be served in this manner. The rules do not specify that a drop serve must be served in this manner, but the limited bounce of the ball, after the drop, necessitates an underhand serve. 
USA Pickleball, USAP, USAPAUSA Pickleball (USAP) is the governing body of pickleball within the United States. It was previously known as the USA Pickleball Association (USAPA) or the US Amateur Pickleball Association (U.S.A.P.A.).

V
VolleyTo hit the ball before it touches the ground and bounces.
Volley serve See Serve.

W
Women's doublesSee Doubles.
Women's singlesSee Singles.
World Pickleball DayOctober 10th of each year. Established by the World Pickleball Federation in 2020.
World Pickleball Federation (WPF)A federation of national pickleball organizations founded in 2018.
WPFSee World Pickleball Federation.

Z
Zane Navratil serveSee Chainsaw serve.
Zero–ZeroThe starting score for a game of singles pickleball.
Zero–Zero–Two or Zero–Zero–StartThe starting score for a game of doubles pickleball.

See also
Etymology of pickleball
Glossary of tennis terms

References

Sources

 
Pickleball terms
Wikipedia glossaries using description lists

External links
Pickleball Canada Resources; including the Pickleball Canada Bilingual Lexicon'', a bilingual list (English & French) of common pickleball terms.